Henry Jay Kirksey Sr. (May 9, 1915 - December 9, 2005) was a state legislator and civil rights leader in Mississippi. He served in the Mississippi Senate. He was born on the outskirts of Tupelo, Mississippi. He advocated and protested for the release of Mississippi Sovereignty Commission records. He also advocated for the Confederate battle flag to be removed from the upper left corner of the Mississippi's state flag.

He opposed construction of the Jackson Metro Parkway. He had a son and a daughter.

He was inducted into the North Carolina Central University Athletics Hall of Fame in 1990 for his football career at the school.

Henry J. Kirksey Middle School in Jackson, Mississippi opened in 2010.

References

1915 births
2005 deaths
Politicians from Tupelo, Mississippi
20th-century American politicians
20th-century African-American politicians
Democratic Party Mississippi state senators
North Carolina Central Eagles football players